This is a list of Croatian counties (županije) by Human Development Index as of 2021, including the city of Zagreb, the capital and largest city.

References 

Croatia
Human Development Index
Counties by Human Development Index
HDI